EasyJet UK Limited, trading as easyJet, is a British low-cost airline and a subsidiary of EasyJet plc. It was founded in 2017, after the UK Government triggered Article 50 to leave the European Union.

History
The airline was established following the UK referendum vote to leave the European Union and the airline's preparation against possible outcomes of Brexit. EasyJet structured itself as a pan-European airline group with three different air operator's certificates, each based in Austria, Switzerland and the United Kingdom.

EasyJet plc is thus a pan-European airline group with three airlines based in the UK, Austria and Switzerland (easyJet UK, easyJet Europe, and easyJet Switzerland), all fully or part-owned by easyJet plc, based in the UK and listed on the London Stock Exchange.

On 17 August 2020, as a result of the COVID-19 pandemic, easyJet announced it would close its bases in Newcastle upon Tyne, London–Stansted and London–Southend on the 31 August 2020.

Destinations

EasyJet UK flies to over 40 countries and over 60 airports.

This list includes the parent company's and its subsidiaries' destinations.

Fleet

, EasyJet UK operates the following aircraft:

References

Airlines of the United Kingdom
Airlines established in 2017
EasyGroup
Low-cost carriers
British companies established in 2017
Companies based in Luton